The Roman Catholic Diocese of Ambato is a diocese located in the city of Ambato in the Ecclesiastical province of Quito in Ecuador.

Special churches
Minor Basilicas:
Nuestra Señora de la Elevación, Ambato

Leadership
Bernardino Carlos Guillermo Honorato Echeverría Ruiz, O.F.M. (23 Oct 1949 – 10 Apr 1969), appointed Archbishop of Guayaquil; future Cardinal
Vicente Rodrigo Cisneros Durán (4 Jul 1969 – 15 Feb 2000), appointed Archbishop of Cuenca
Germán Trajano Pavón Puente (19 Apr 2001 – 20 Jan 2015)
Jorge Giovanny Pazmiño Abril, O.P. (20 Jan 2015–present)

External links
Official website
GCatholic.org
Catholic Hierarchy

Roman Catholic dioceses in Ecuador
Roman Catholic Ecclesiastical Province of Quito
Christian organizations established in 1948
Roman Catholic dioceses and prelatures established in the 20th century
1948 establishments in Ecuador